Oktyabrskoye is a rural locality (a selo) and the administrative center of Prigorodny District of the Republic of North Ossetia–Alania, Russia. Population:

References

Notes

Sources

Rural localities in North Ossetia–Alania